James "J. J." Frazier Jr. (born September 19, 1995) is an American professional basketball player for Skyliners Frankfurt of the Basketball Bundesliga. He played college basketball for the Georgia Bulldogs.

High school career
Frazier attended Faith Baptist Christian Academy, where he grew from 5'2 as a freshman and became their lead guard. He was a three-star prospect and signed with Georgia.

College career
He averaged 9.5 points, 3.8 rebounds and 3.3 assists per game as a sophomore. In August 2015, Frazier was arrested for two driving-related offenses. As a junior, Frazier averaged 16.9 points and 4.6 rebounds per game. He was named to the Second Team All-SEC. As a senior, Frazier averaged 18.8 points, 4.2 assists, 3.8 rebounds and 1.85 steals per game per game and was named to the First Team All-SEC. During a five-game stretch in February 2017 following an injury to Yante Maten, he averaged 29.6 points per game.

Professional career
After going undrafted in the 2017 NBA draft, Frazier signed with JDA Dijon in France in July 2017. In 16 games, Frazier averaged 8.2 points, 2.6 assists and 2.3 rebounds in 20.9 minutes per game. In February 2018, he was signed by the Memphis Hustle of the NBA G League. Frazier later joined Treviglio of the Italian Serie A2 Basket. In eight games with the team, Frazier posted 24.1 points, 4.4 assists, 3.1 rebounds and 1.38 steals in 32.5 minutes per game, including a 32-point game against Latina Basket on April 8, 2018. He played with NPC Rieti before suffering a season-ending injury four games into the season. On June 28, 2019, Frazier signed a two-year deal with Givova Scafati. After posting 37 points, 13 rebounds and 6 assists against Bergamo Basket 2014, he was named MVP of Serie A2 for the 14th day on December 24, 2019. Frazier averaged 18.2 points per game for Scafati. He returned to Treviglio on July 18, 2020. Frazier averaged 15.8 points, 4.6 rebounds, 4.9 assists and 1.2 steals per game. On August 30, 2021, he signed with Samsunspor of the Turkish Basketball First League.

On August 6, 2022, he has signed with Skyliners Frankfurt of the Basketball Bundesliga.

References

External links
Georgia Bulldogs bio
EuroBasket profile

1995 births
Living people
American expatriate basketball people in France
American expatriate basketball people in Italy
Basketball players from Savannah, Georgia
Georgia Bulldogs basketball players
Memphis Hustle players
Skyliners Frankfurt players